My Friend Joe is a 1996 film directed by Chris Bould starring Schuyler Fisk and John Cleere. The film is based on the 1985 Swedish novel Janne, min vän (Johnny, My Friend) by Peter Pohl.

Plot summary 
Chris' new best friend, the American Joe, turns out not to be a boy, but a girl.

Cast 
Schuyler Fisk as Joe
John Cleere as Chris Doyle
Stephen McHattie as Curt
Stanley Townsend as Mr. Doyle
Pauline McLynn as Ms. Doyle
Eoin Hughes as Boyler
Mark Hannigan as Conor
Stuart Dannell-Foran as Noel
Joel Grey as Simon
Katie Carroll as Suzie
Katy Davis as Aideen
Didier Pasquette as Nicolai

Awards and honors 
 16th Ale Kino! International Young Audience Film Festival, 1998
 Chris Bould won "Silver Poznan Goat" for "Best Live-Action Film"
 The film won "Marcin - Children's Jury Award" for "Best Live-Action Film"
 Schuyler Fisk won "Poznań Goats" for Best Foreign Child Actor or Actress 
 Berlin International Film Festival, 1996
Chris Bould won "Award of the Senator for Women, Youth and Family" 
 Carrousel International du Film, 1996
Chris Bould won "Audience Camério" 
 German Children's-Film & TV-Festival, 1997
The film won "Children Jury Golden Sparrow" for "Best Feature - Long"
 Chicago International Children's Film Festival, 1998
Chris Bould won 2nd prize "Children's Jury Award" for "Feature Film and Video"

External links 
 

1996 films
German drama films
Irish drama films
1996 drama films
English-language German films
English-language Irish films
Films shot in Cologne
British drama films
Films based on Swedish novels
1990s English-language films
1990s British films
1990s German films